James Albert Clement Tabor  (11 February 1840 – 14 February 1880) was an English first-class cricketer and barrister.

The son of James Tabor, he was born in February 1840 at Prittlewell, Essex. He was educated at Eton College, before matriculating at Trinity College, Cambridge in 1857.

Tabor played first-class cricket for the Marylebone Cricket Club (MCC) against Cambridge University at Fenner's in 1863. He batted once in the match, ending the MCC's first innings unbeaten on 2 runs. A student of the Inner Temple, he was called to the bar in January 1865. He was also a justice of the peace for Essex. Tabor died unexpectedly on 14 February 1880 at Great Baddow, Essex.

References

External links

1840 births
1880 deaths
People from Southend-on-Sea (district)
People educated at Eton College
Alumni of Trinity College, Cambridge
English cricketers
Marylebone Cricket Club cricketers
Members of the Inner Temple
English justices of the peace
English barristers